TFI may refer to:

Companies and organizations
 Taiwan Film Institute, later Taiwan Film and Audiovisual Institute, Taipei
 Teach For India
 TFI International, Canadian transport  company

Governmental entities
 The Office of Terrorism and Financial Intelligence, U.S. Treasury 
 Transitional Federal Institutions of Somalia, 2004
 Transport for Ireland, public transport operator

Other uses
 TFI-5 in computer networking
 Test de français international, a French language test
 The Family International, formerly Children of God religious movement

See also
TF1, French TV network